Pratya Narach (born January 9, 1989), is a professional footballer from Thailand.

External links

1989 births
Living people
Pratya Narach
Pratya Narach
Association football midfielders
Pratya Narach
Pratya Narach
Pratya Narach
Pratya Narach
Pratya Narach